HexChat is an Internet Relay Chat client that is a fork of XChat. It has a choice of a tabbed document interface or tree interface, support for multiple servers, and numerous configuration options. Both command-line and graphical versions were available.

The client runs on Unix-like operating systems, and many Linux distributions include packages in their repositories.

History 
The XChat-WDK (XChat Windows Driver Kit) project started in 2010 and was originally Windows-only.  The project's original goal was to merge itself with XChat, but evolved from just fixing Windows bugs to adding new features.  It started to make sense to support more platforms than Windows. On July 6, 2012, XChat-WDK officially changed its name to HexChat.

See also

 Comparison of Internet Relay Chat clients

References

External links

 
  on Libera Chat

Free Internet Relay Chat clients
Instant messaging clients that use GTK
Internet Relay Chat clients
MacOS Internet Relay Chat clients
Unix Internet Relay Chat clients
Windows Internet Relay Chat clients